Barmer Lok Sabha constituency is one of the 25 Lok Sabha (parliamentary) constituencies in Rajasthan state in western India. It is the second largest parliamentary constituency covering an area of 71,601 km2, over twice the size of Belgium.  Jaisalmer and Barmer, the third and fifth largest districts in India, both fall under this Lok Sabha seat. 

Former Defense Minister Jaswant Singh contested from this seat as a rebel BJP candidate in 2014. His son Manvendra Singh has also contested a few times from here.

Vidhan Sabha segments
Presently, Barmer Lok Sabha constituency comprises Eight Vidhan Sabha (legislative assembly) segments. These are:

Members of Lok Sabha

Election Results

2019 Lok Sabha Elections

2004 Lok Sabha Elections

1962 Lok Sabha
 Tan Singh (Ram Rajya Parishad) : 100,395 votes 
 Onkar Singh (INC) : 82,684

See also
 Barmer district
 Ladakh (Lok Sabha constituency) and Kachchh (Lok Sabha constituency), noted for their large area
 List of Constituencies of the Lok Sabha

Notes

Barmer district
Lok Sabha constituencies in Rajasthan
Barmer, Rajasthan